Richard H. Dale (25 April 1927 – 30 April 1961), known as Dickie Dale, was a Grand Prix motorcycle road racer born in Wyberton near Boston, Lincolnshire, England. In 1945 he was drafted into the RAF and served as a flight mechanic, and bought his first motorcycle, a 1939 AJS Silver Streak, while stationed at RAF Cranwell.

He competed in the inaugural 1949 Grand Prix motorcycle racing season. Dale was a victor in the 1951 North West 200. His best seasons were 1955 and 1956 when he finished in second place in the 350cc world championship, both times behind his Moto Guzzi teammate Bill Lomas. Dale also competed in the 500cc class aboard Moto Guzzi's famous V8 Grand Prix bike. He died on the way to hospital in a helicopter, after crashing during the 1961 Eifelrennen race at the Nürburgring in what was then West Germany.

References 

1927 births
1961 deaths
People from Wyberton
British motorcycle racers
English motorcycle racers
English expatriates in Germany
250cc World Championship riders
350cc World Championship riders
500cc World Championship riders
Isle of Man TT riders
Motorcycle racers who died while racing
Sport deaths in Germany